Atimatim is a town in the Kwabre East District of the Ashanti Region of Ghana.

See also
Pankrono

Populated places in the Ashanti Region